Elections to the Baseball Hall of Fame for 2000 followed the system in use since 1995. The Baseball Writers' Association of America (BBWAA) voted by mail to select from recent major league players and 
elected two: Carlton Fisk and Tony Pérez. The Veterans Committee met in closed sessions and selected three people from multiple classified ballots: Sparky Anderson, Bid McPhee, and Turkey Stearnes.

Induction ceremonies in Cooperstown, New York, were held July 23 with George Grande as master of ceremonies.

BBWAA election

The BBWAA was authorized to elect players active in 1980 or later but not after 1994 (final game, 1980 to 1994). The ballot comprised 30 candidates, 16 returning from the 1999 ballot, where they received at least 5% support, and 14 on the ballot for the first time (†), chosen by a screening committee from players who last appeared in 1994. All 10-year members of the BBWAA were eligible to participate by voting for as many as 10 candidates; any candidate receiving votes on at least 75% of the ballots returned would be honored with induction to the Hall.

Results were announced on January 11, 2000. A total of 499 ballots were returned so 375 votes were required for election. A total of 2813 individual votes were cast, an average of 5.64 per ballot. Candidates who received less than 5% support, or 25 votes, would not appear on future BBWAA ballots (*). They were also eliminated from future consideration by the Veterans Committee of the time, but that possibility was restored by new arrangements passed in 2001 and eligibility for the Veterans Committee ballot remains unrelated to performance in BBWAA elections after subsequent reforms.

Two players were elected and 15 with final games played during 1981–94 were forwarded to next year.

The newly-eligible players included 16 All-Stars, three who were not included on the ballot, representing a total of 43 All-Star selections. Among the new candidates were 9-time All-Star Goose Gossage and 5-time All-Stars Steve Sax and Jack Morris. The field included two Rookies of the Year (Sax and Rick Sutcliffe) and two Cy Young Award winners (Sutcliffe and Bob Welch).

Players eligible for the first time who were not included on the ballot were: Larry Andersen, Daryl Boston, Sid Bream, Tom Brunansky, Storm Davis, Steve Farr, Mike Felder, Joe Hesketh, Jay Howell, Mike Jeffcoat, Tim Leary, Craig Lefferts, Kevin McReynolds, Bob Melvin, Edwin Núñez, Bob Ojeda, Junior Ortiz, Dan Pasqua, Gary Redus, and Harold Reynolds.

The Veterans Committee

The Veterans Committee met in closed sessions to elect as many as two executives, managers, umpires, and older major league players—the categories considered in all its meetings since 1953.

The older players eligible were those with ten major league seasons beginning 1945 or earlier; those who received at least 100 votes from the BBWAA in some election up to 1990; and those who received at least 60% support in some election beginning 1991. Players on Major League Baseball's ineligible list were also ineligible for election.

By an arrangement since 1995 the committee separately considered candidates from the Negro leagues and from the 19th century with authority to select one from each of those two special ballots.
It elected three people, one fewer than the maximum number permitted: manager Sparky Anderson from the 1970s, center fielder Turkey Stearnes from the Negro leagues, and second baseman Bid McPhee from the 19th century.

J. G. Taylor Spink Award
Hal Lebovitz received the J. G. Taylor Spink Award honoring a baseball writer. (The award was voted at the December 1999 meeting of the BBWAA, dated 1999, and conferred in the summer 2000 ceremonies.)

Ford C. Frick Award
Marty Brennaman received the Ford C. Frick Award honoring a baseball broadcaster.

External links
2000 Election at www.baseballhalloffame.org.

References 

Baseball Hall of Fame balloting
Hall of Fame balloting